Fergusson may refer to:

Places
County of Fergusson, South Australia, Australia
Fergusson Island, off the coast of New Guinea
Fergusson Glacier, Wilson Hills, Antarctica
Nacimiento-Fergusson Road, the only road across the Santa Lucia Range in the Central Coast of California
 Fergusson Square, Toorak Gardens, South Australia, Australia; in Adelaide

People
Fergusson (surname), including a list of people with the surname
Fergusson baronets of Nova Scotia
Ferguson Wright Hume (1859–1932), British novelist

Other uses
Fergusson Bridge, Cambridge, New Zealand; over the Waikato River
Fergusson Intermediate, Upper Hutt, Wellington, New Zealand; a co-ed intermediate school
Fergusson University (formerly Fergusson College), in Pune, India
Fergusson Museum, Bhuj, Kutch, Gujarat, India
Robert Fergusson (store), Australian chain of stores

See also

 Governor Fergusson (disambiguation)
 Fergusson College Road, Pune, India
 Fergusson Island striped possum
 
 Fergie (disambiguation)
 Ferguson (disambiguation)